Somebody Like Me is an album by American country music singer Eddy Arnold. It was released by RCA Victor in 1966.

The album debuted on Billboard magazine's Top Country Albums chart on December 24, 1966, spent two weeks at No. 1, and remained on the chart for a total of 36 weeks. The album included two hit singles: "Somebody Like Me" (No. 1) and "The Tip of My Fingers" (No. 3).

AllMusic gave the album a rating of two stars. Reviewer Greg Adams called it "one of the blandest middle-of-the-road pop records Eddy Arnold made in the '60s, [and] also one of his most commercially successful."

Track listing
Side A
 "Somebody Like Me" (Wayne Carson)
 "Lay Some Happiness on Me"
 "There's Always Me"
 "Come By Me Nice and Slow"
 "You Made Up for Everything"
 "At Sunset

Side B
 "The Tip of My Fingers" (Bill Anderson)
 "Love on My Mind"
 "I Love You Drops"
 "Don't Laugh at My Love"
 "Ev'ry Step of the Way"
 "It's Only Love"

References

1966 albums
RCA Victor albums
Eddy Arnold albums